China competed at the 2020 Summer Paralympics in Tokyo, Japan from 24 August to 5 September 2021. This was their tenth consecutive appearance at the Summer Paralympics since 1984. China sent 251 athletes to the Games and competed in 20 of the 22 sports except Equestrian and Wheelchair rugby.

Medalists

Competitors
The following is the list of number of competitors participating in the Games:

Archery

China have qualified 11 quotas for archery.

Men

Women

Mixed

Athletics

China is scheduled to compete in athletics.
Men's track

Men's field

Women's track

Women's field

Badminton 

Men

Women

Boccia

Cycling

Football 5-a-side 

Team roster

Group A

Semi-final

Bronze medal match

Goalball 

Summary

Men

Group stage

Quarter-final

Semi-finals

Gold medal match

Women

Group stage

Quarterfinal

Judo

Paracanoe

Paratriathlon

Powerlifting 

Men

Women

Rowing

China qualified one boat in the mixed double sculls for the games by winning the B-final and securing the seven of eight available place at the 2019 World Rowing Championships in Ottensheim, Austria.

Qualification Legend: FA=Final A (medal); FB=Final B (non-medal); R=Repechage

Shooting

China entered ten athletes into the Paralympic competition. All of them successfully break the Paralympic qualification at the 2018 WSPS World Championships which was held in Cheongju, South Korea, 2019 WSPS World Cup in Al Ain, United Arab Emirates and 2019 WSPS World Championships in Sydney, Australia.

Men

Women

Mixed

Sitting volleyball

China's men's and women's teams have booked a spot to compete for their country at the Summer Paralympics after their wins at the 2019 Asia Oceania Sitting Volleyball Championships in Thailand.

Summary

Men's tournament 

Group play

Seventh place match

Women's tournament 

Group play

Semi-final

Gold medal match

Swimming

China have earned fourteen slot allocations at the 2019 World Para Swimming Championships.
Men

Women

Mixed

Table tennis

China entered twenty-six athletes into the table tennis competition at the games. Twelve athletes qualified from 2019 ITTF African Para Championships which was held in Taichung, Taiwan and fourteen athletes via World Ranking allocation.

Men

Women

Taekwondo

China qualified one athletes to compete at the Paralympics competition. Li Yujie will compete after placing second in world ranking, to booked one of six available place.

Wheelchair basketball

Women's tournament

Roster

Groupstage

Quarterfinal

Semifinal

Gold medal match

Wheelchair fencing

Wheelchair tennis

China qualified five players entries for wheelchair tennis. All of them qualified by the world rankings.

See also
China at the Paralympics
China at the 2020 Summer Olympics

References

Nations at the 2020 Summer Paralympics
2021 in Chinese sport
2020